Wang Xiulan (born 24 November 1971) is a Chinese short track speed skater. She competed at the 1992 Winter Olympics and the 1994 Winter Olympics.

References

1971 births
Living people
Chinese female short track speed skaters
Olympic short track speed skaters of China
Short track speed skaters at the 1992 Winter Olympics
Short track speed skaters at the 1994 Winter Olympics
Place of birth missing (living people)
Asian Games medalists in short track speed skating
Short track speed skaters at the 1990 Asian Winter Games
Medalists at the 1990 Asian Winter Games
Asian Games gold medalists for China
20th-century Chinese women